Marmer may refer to:

Harry A. Marmer (1885-1953), Ukrainian-born American mathematician and oceanographer
Nancy Marmer (b. ? ), American writer, art critic, and editor
USC&GS Marmer, a United States Coast and Geodetic Survey survey ship in commission from 1957 to 1968